Kandani Shrine (神谷神社, Kandani jinja) is a Shinto shrine located in Sakaide, Kagawa Prefecture, Japan. It enshrines the kami Kagu-tsuchi (火結命), Okitsuhiko no mikoto (奥津彦命), and Okitsuhime no mikoto (奥津姫命). According to legend, the shrine was established in 812. The shrine's main hall (本殿, honden) has been designated a Japanese National Treasure.

See also
List of Shinto shrines in Japan

External links
Sakaide City website

Shinto shrines in Kagawa Prefecture

Kandani-jinja